The list of shipwrecks in April 1827 includes some ships sunk, wrecked or otherwise lost during April 1827.

2 April

13 April

19 April

21 April

23 April

24 April

25 April

26 April

27 April

29 April

30 April

Unknown date

References

1827-04